
The word banua or vanua (the latter from various languages of Melanesia, see below) – meaning "land," "home," or "village" – occurs in several Austronesian languages. It derives from the Proto-Austronesian reconstructed form *banua. The word has particular significance in several countries.

In Western Malayo-Polynesian languages

Philippines
Kapampangan
In the Kapampangan language, banwa or banua means "sky" or "year".
Visayan
In the Hiligaynon Visayan language, banwa means "people", "nation" or "country."

Malaysia and Indonesia
Malay
In the Malay language (the lingua franca of both Malaysia and Indonesia), benua means "landmass" or "continent". The word for "land" in these languages and nearby Austronesian languages — e.g., in Tana Toraja, Tana Tidung or Tanö Niha – are tanah or tana.
Banjar
In the Banjar language, banua means "village" or "homeland".
Old Javanese
In the Old Javanese language, wanwa or wanua means "village", "inhabited place" or "settlement".
Buginese
In the Buginese language, banua means "village", "country", "land" or "homeland".
Toraja
In the Toraja language, banua means "home".
Old Sundanese
In the Old Sundanese language, banua or buana means "continent" or "world".
Minahasa
In all Minahasan languages, wanua means "village", "country", or "land". The word Kawanua means land of the Minahasan people.
Dayak
In Iban (used by the Dayak people), menua or menoa means "place", "country", "land" or  "homeland". In many other Dayak languages, the word has the form binua.

In Oceania
In some Oceanic languages of Melanesia, the root *banua has sometimes become vanua, via Proto-Oceanic *panua.

In Papua New Guinea
In Motu, the word hanua means "village". The name of a village near Port Moresby is called Hanuabada, meaning "big village".

In Palau
In Palauan, which is a non-Oceanic Austronesian language, beluu means "village" or "country", as can be seen in the native name of the country, Beluu er a Belau.

In Vanuatu
In Vanuatu, vanua also means "land", "island" or "home." The name of the Vanua'aku Pati literally means "The party of My Land". Hence also the name of Vanuatu itself, and the place name Vanua Lava (literally ‘big island’ in Mota language).
Lo-Toga
In the Lo-Toga language, the word venie means "village", "island" or "country".
Mwotlap
In Mwotlap, the word vōnō means "village", "district", "island" or "country".

In Fiji
In Fijian and in Fiji English, vanua is an essential concept of indigenous Fijian culture and society. It is generally translated in English as "land", but vanua as a concept encompasses a number of inter-related meanings. When speaking in English, Fijians may use the word vanua rather than an imprecise English equivalent. According to Fijian academic Asesela Ravuvu, a correct translation would be "land, people and custom". Vanua means "the land area one is identified with", but also
"the people, their traditions and customs, beliefs and values, and the various other institutions established for the sake of achieving harmony, solidarity and prosperity within a particular social context. [...] It provides a sense of identity and belonging. [...] The vanua [...] is an extension of the concept of the self."

An indigenous Fijian person is thus defined through his or her land; the concepts of personhood and land ownership are viewed as inseparable. This is also the case for other indigenous peoples of Oceania, such as Australian Aboriginals (see: Dreaming) and New Zealand Māori (see: iwi).

A vanua is also a confederation of several yavusa ("clans" established through descent from a common ancestor). A vanua in this sense is associated with its ownership of an area of vanua in the sense of "land"; the various meanings of vanua are, here too, interrelated.

The word vanua is found in the place names Vanua Levu and Vanua Balavu.

Indigenous land ownership is a key issue in conservative and indigenous nationalistic Fijian politics. Several right-wing, essentially indigenous parties refer to vanua in their names:
Nationalist Vanua Tako Lavo Party
Soqosoqo Duavata ni Lewenivanua

Polynesian languages
Māori
In Māori language, whenua means homeland or country. The Māori people call themselves Tāngata whenua, or people of the land.
Tongan
In Tongan, fonua means land or country.
Hawaiian
In Hawaiian honua means land, earth, or foundation, and is usually used in the more literal sense. Land in the more figurative or spiritual sense is usually represented by the word ʻāina, and locally-born people are referred to as kamaʻāina (child of the land).
Other Polynesian languages
Elsewhere, the form of the word is generally fenua.

See also
Austronesian languages
Austronesian peoples
Cultural identity
Culture of Fiji

References

Cultural anthropology
Fijian culture